Ovnat is a small Israeli settlement in the West Bank on the western shore of the Dead Sea, about  south of Kalya and  north of Mitzpe Shalem. It falls under the jurisdiction of Megilot Regional Council.

The international community considers Israeli settlements in the West Bank illegal under international law, but the Israeli government disputes this.

History

It was founded in mid-2004, where a Nahal settlement existed since 1983. It is named after Asenath.

According to ARIJ, Israel confiscated 124 dunams of land from the Palestinian town of al-Ubeidiya in order to construct Ovnat.

References

External links
 Avnat homepage  

Nahal settlements
Populated places established in 1983
1983 establishments in the Palestinian territories
Israeli settlements in the West Bank